Gardinovci is a village located in the Titel municipality, South Bačka District, Vojvodina, Serbia. The village has a Serb ethnic majority and its population numbering 1,297 people (as of 2011 census).

Name
In Serbian, the village is known as Gardinovci or Гардиновци, in Croatian as Gardinovci, and in Hungarian as Dunagárdony. The name of the village in Serbian is plural.

Demographics

As of 2011 census, the village of Gardinovci has a population of 1,297 inhabitants.

See also
 List of places in Serbia
 List of cities, towns and villages in Vojvodina

References
 Slobodan Ćurčić, Broj stanovnika Vojvodine, Novi Sad, 1996.

External links

Places in Bačka
South Bačka District